Hellinsia coquimboicus is a moth of the family Pterophoridae. It is found in Chile.

The wingspan is 19 mm. The forewings are brown‑grey with scattered dark brown scaling, condensed
in discal spot. The hindwings are grey and the fringes are grey‑white. Adults are on wing in November.

References

Moths described in 1991
coquimboicus
Pterophoridae of South America
Fauna of Chile
Moths of South America
Endemic fauna of Chile